Carlos Rafael Uribazo Garrido (born April 16, 1951, in Santiago de Cuba, Cuba) is a Cuban artist specializing with painting, engraving, drawing, graphic design, photography, and ceramics. Since 1989, Uribazo resides in Madrid, Spain.

Individual exhibitions
 1970 -  "Grabados y Dibujos de Uribazo"; Biblioteca Elvira Cape, in Santiago de Cuba, Cuba.
 1982  - "Recuento Gráfico de Carlos Uribazo", Pequeño Salon, Museo Nacional de Bellas Artes de La Habana, Havana, Cuba.
 1991 - "Pintures. Uribazo", Galería San Sisteré, Santa Coloma de Gramenet, Barcelona, Spain.
 1995 - "Pintura de Uribazo", Expo Arte, Centro Internacional de Arte, Madrid, Spain.

Collective exhibitions
He has been a part of many collective exhibitions:
 1971 -Salón Nacional para artistas jóvenes in the Museo Nacional de Bellas Artes de La Habana, Havana, Cuba
 1976 - "Cuban Poster Show", The Interchurch Center organized by the Center for Cuban Studies, New York City.
 1976 - "Viva Cuba Libre"; Festival de la Revista Avant Garde, Paris, France.
 1992 - "Bienal de Mini Grabado"; Museo Municipal de Ourense, Ourense, Galicia, Spain.
1995 - "I Encuentro Cultural Hispanoamericano"; Mercado de Puerta de Toledo, Madrid, Spain.

Awards
Uribazo has obtained various recognitions:
 1975 - Second Place in Design, "III Salón Nacional de Profesores e Instructores de Artes Plásticas"; Galería de La Habana, Havana, Cuba.
 1975 - Second Place in Engraving, "III Salón Nacional de Profesores e Instructores de Artes Plásticas"; Galería de La Habana, Havana, Cuba.
 1986 - Honorable Mention in Engraving, "Salón de la Ciudad'86", Centro Provincial de Artes Plásticas y Diseño, in Havana, Cuba.
 1992 - Juror's Special Mention, "Bienal de Mini Grabado", Museo Municipal de Ourense,  Ourense, Spain.

Collections
His works are in the permanent collections of:
 Fundació Jaume Guasch, in Barcelona, Spain;
 Collection of Engravings; Gallery of New Masters, Dresden, Germany;
 Museo Nacional de Bellas Artes de La Habana, Cuba;
 Museo Torre Baldovina, Santa Coloma de Gramenet, Barcelona, Spain.

References
  Jose Veigas-Zamora, Cristina Vives Gutierrez, Adolfo V. Nodal, Valia Garzon, Dannys Montes de Oca; Memoria: Cuban Art of the 20th Century; (California/International Arts Foundation 2001); 
 Jose Viegas; Memoria: Artes Visuales Cubanas Del Siglo Xx; (California Intl Arts 2004);

External links
 

Cuban expatriates in Spain
Cuban painters
Modern painters
Cuban contemporary artists
1951 births
Living people